Garu (also Romanized as Gārū; also known as Qārūn) is a village in Rameshk Rural District, Chah Dadkhoda District, Qaleh Ganj County, Kerman Province, Iran. At the 2006 census, its population was 614, in 150 families.

References 

Populated places in Qaleh Ganj County